Erhard Loretan (28 April 1959 – 28 April 2011) was a Swiss mountain climber, often described as one of the greatest mountaineers of all times.

Biography
Loretan was born in Bulle in the canton of Fribourg. He trained as a cabinet maker (1979) and mountain guide (1981).

Loretan was the third person to climb all 14 eight-thousanders (second without oxygen), a feat he accomplished at the age of 36. He made his first expedition to the Andes in 1980 and began climbing the eight-thousanders in 1982 with an ascent of Nanga Parbat. Thirteen years later, in 1995, he climbed the last of them, Kangchenjunga.  Loretan took the principles of climbing fast and light in the Alps and applied them to the biggest mountains on Earth.  In 1984, he did a first ascent of Annapurna (8091m) by the 7km long east ridge with Norbert Joos and descended via the north side, a traverse that has never been repeated.  In 1986, together with Jean Troillet, Loretan made a revolutionary ascent of Mount Everest in only 40 hours, climbing by night and without the use of supplementary oxygen.  In 1988, he completed a new route with Voytek Kurtyka on the Nameless Tower (6239m), Trango Towers, Pakistan. In 1994, he made a  solo first ascent of Mt Epperly (4508m) in Antarctica’s Sentinel Range. While making the ascent, he noticed a nameless peak, c4800m, steeper and more difficult than Epperly. In autumn 1995, after climbing Kangchenjunga (his fourteenth 8000m mountain), Loretan returned to Antarctica and made a first solo ascent of this peak, which has been named Peak Loretan.

Loretan was convicted in 2003 of the manslaughter of his seven-month-old son, after shaking him for a short period of time to stop him crying in late 2001. He was given a four-month suspended sentence. At that time shaken baby syndrome (SBS) was largely unknown, but he decided to disclose his name to the press in the hope that other parents might avoid a similar tragedy. Publicity of the case raised awareness of the danger of shaking children due to their weak neck muscles.

In April 2011, Loretan and his partner Xenia Minder were climbing the Grünhorn in the Swiss Alps when Minder slipped. The rope tying them together dragged them both down 200m. Minder was airlifted to the hospital with serious injuries, but Loretan did not survive. He died on his 52nd birthday.

Climbing history

See also
List of 20th-century summiters of Mount Everest

References

External links
Erhard Loretan on Jerberyd.se

1959 births
2011 deaths
Accidental deaths in Switzerland
Mountaineering deaths
People convicted of manslaughter
Summiters of all 14 eight-thousanders
Swiss mountain climbers
People from Bulle
Sport deaths in Switzerland